The 2018 Women's Junior NORCECA Volleyball Championship was the eleventh edition of the bi-annual tournament. It was held in Aguascalientes City from 16 June to 24 June, and featured eight teams. The United States won the tournament and qualified to the 2019 FIVB Women's Junior World Championship. American Logan Eggleston was awarded Most Valuable Player.

Teams

Squads

Pool standing procedure
Match won 3–0: 5 points for the winner, 0 point for the loser
Match won 3–1: 4 points for the winner, 1 points for the loser
Match won 3–2: 3 points for the winner, 2 points for the loser
In case of equality in the number of matches won and lost, the tie will be broken according to the following criteria in order of importance:
Match points
Point Ratio
Set Ratio
Head-to-head result

Preliminary round
All times are in Central Daylight Time–(UTC−06:00)

Group A

Group B

Final round

Bracket

Quarterfinals

5th-8th Classification

Semifinals

7th place

5th place

3rd place

Final

Final standing

Individual awards

Most Valuable Player

Best Setter

Best Opposite

Best Outside Hitters

Best Middle Blockers

Best Libero

Best Digger

Best Receiver

Best Server

Best Scorer

References

External links
NORCECA
Summary of Stats
Regulations

Women's NORCECA Volleyball Championship
NORCECA
Women's Junior NORCECA Volleyball Championship
International volleyball competitions hosted by Mexico
Sport in Aguascalientes
Volleyball in Mexico